
Year 1570 (MDLXX) was a common year starting on Sunday (link will display the full calendar) of the Julian calendar.

Events 
 January–June 
 January 8 – Ivan the Terrible begins the Massacre of Novgorod.
 January 23 – The assassination of Scottish regent James Stewart, 1st Earl of Moray, by James Hamilton (the first recorded assassination using a firearm in Europe), throws Scotland into civil war.
 February 8 – A magnitude 8.3 earthquake occurs in Concepción, Chile.
 February 15 – Venus occults Jupiter; this will next happen in 1818.
 February 25 – Pope Pius V excommunicates Queen Elizabeth I of England, with the bull Regnans in Excelsis.
 May 20 – Abraham Ortelius publishes the first modern atlas, Theatrum Orbis Terrarum, in Antwerp.
 May 24 – Battle of Manila: The Spanish, led by Martín de Goiti, defeat the forces of Raja Sulayman.
 June 10 – The Kingdom of Livonia is established.

 July–December 
 July 3 – The Ottoman conquest of Cyprus begins.
 July 14 – Pope Pius V issues Quo primum, promulgating the 1570 edition of the Roman Missal.
 July 22 – Thomson Snell & Passmore is founded, the oldest law firm in operation. 
 July 30 – Battle of Anegawa: The allied forces of Oda Nobunaga and  Tokugawa Ieyasu defeat the combined forces of the Azai and Asakura clans.
 August 8 – The Peace of Saint-Germain ends the Third War of Religion in France. Again, the Huguenots are promised religious freedom and political autonomy.
 August 16 – The Treaty of Speyer is signed between John Sigismund Zápolya, Prince of Transylvania and Maximilian II, King of Hungary.
 September 10 – A party of ten Spanish Jesuit missionaries land on the Virginia Peninsula of North America to establish the Ajacán Mission, which will be massacred in February 1571.
 November 16-17 – The 1570 Ferrara earthquake strikes the Italian city of Ferrara. After the initial shocks, a sequence of aftershocks continue for four years, with over 2,000 in the period from November 1570 to February 1571.
 December 13 – The Treaty of Stettin ends the Northern Seven Years' War.

 Date unknown 
 Spanish conquistador Juan de Salcedo (in the service of Miguel López de Legazpi) begins the conquest of the Kingdom of Maynila.
 Construction of the original Catedral Nuestra Señora de La Asunción, the oldest church in Venezuela, begins.
 The Whitechapel Bell Foundry is known to be in existence in London. By 2017, when it closes its premises in Whitechapel, it will be the oldest manufacturing company in Great Britain.
 Andrea Palladio publishes I quattro libri dell'architettura in Venice.
 Volcanic eruption in the Santorini caldera begins.
 The Andean population of the Viceroyalty of Peru reaches 1.3 million.

Births 

 January 1
 Jacob Dircksz de Graeff, Dutch politician, burgomaster of Amsterdam (d. 1638)
 Dorothea of Brunswick-Lüneburg, Spouse of Charles I, Count Palatine of Zweibrücken-Birkenfeld (d. 1649)
 John Dackombe, Chancellor of the Duchy of Lancaster (d. 1618)
 January 19 – Wolfgang Hirschbach, German legal scholar (d. 1620)
 January 22 – Robert Bruce Cotton, English politician (d. 1631)
 February – Henry Balnaves, Scottish politician and religious reformer (b. 1512)
 March 25 – Henry Lennard, 12th Baron Dacre, English baron and politician (d. 1616)
 April 13 – Guy Fawkes, English conspirator (d. 1606)
 May 8 – Tamás Esterházy, Hungarian writer (d. 1616)
 May 22 – Johann II, Duke of Saxe-Weimar, German duke (d. 1605)
 June 7 – Sultan Murad Mirza, Mughal prince (d. 1599)
 June 13 – Paul Peuerl, German organist (d. 1625)
 August 10 – Philip, Duke of Holstein-Gottorp (1587–1590) (d. 1590)
 August 21 – Christopher, Duke of Brunswick-Harburg, co-ruler of Brunswick-Lüneburg-Harburg (1603–1606) (d. 1606)
 August 22 – Franz von Dietrichstein, German Catholic bishop (d. 1636)
 August 31 – Gustav of Saxe-Lauenburg, German noble (d. 1597)
 September 28 – Sir Richard Hoghton, 1st Baronet, English politician (d. 1630)
 October 3 – George Coke, British bishop (d. 1646)
 October 4 – Péter Pázmány, Hungarian cardinal and statesman (d. 1637)
 October 7
 Volkert Overlander, Dutch mayor (d. 1630)
 Jean Richardot the Younger, Belgian politician (d. 1614)
 November 1 – Phineas Pett, English shipwright and member of the Pett Dynasty (d. 1647)
 November 15 – Francesco Curradi, Italian painter (d. 1661)
 November 20 – Giovanni Battista Agucchi, Italian churchman, papal diplomat, and writer on art theory (d. 1632)
 November 26 – Christian, Duke of Schleswig-Holstein-Sonderburg-Ærø (1622–1633) (d. 1633)
 November 28 – James Whitelocke, English judge (d. 1632)
 December 7 – Richard Cecil, English politician (d. 1633)
 December 29 – Wilhelm Lamormaini, Luxembourgian theologian (d. 1648)
 date unknown
 Diego Aduarte, Prior of Manila (d. 1637)
 Robert Aytoun, Scottish poet (d. 1638)
 Ebba Bielke, Swedish baroness and conspirator (d. 1618) 
 John Cooper, English composer and lutenist (d. 1626)
 John Farmer, English composer (d. c.1601)
 Simon Grahame, Scottish-born adventurer (d. 1614)
 Nakagawa Hidenari, Japanese daimyō (d. 1612)
 Hans Lippershey, Dutch lensmaker (d. 1619)
 Asprilio Pacelli, Italian Baroque composer (d. 1623)
 Girolamo Rainaldi, Italian architect (d. 1655)
 Salamone Rossi, Italian violinist and composer (d. 1630)
 John Smyth, English Baptist minister (d. 1612)
 Chief Powhatan, Algonquin chief (d. 1620)
 Claudia Sessa, Italian composer (d. 1617/19)
 Katharina Henot, German General Postmaster and alleged witch (d. 1627)
 Urszula Meyerin, politically influential Polish courtier (d. 1635)
 Christina Rauscher, German official and critic of witchcraft persecutions (d. 1618)

Deaths 

 January 8 – Philibert de l'Orme, French architect (b. 1510)
 January 23 – James Stewart, 1st Earl of Moray, regent of Scotland (assassinated) (b. c.1531)
 February 13 – Eleonora Gonzaga, Duchess of Urbino, politically active Italian  duchess (b. 1493)
 February 20 – Johannes Scheubel, German mathematician (b. 1494)
 March 1 – Bernhard VII, Prince of Anhalt-Zerbst (b. 1540)
 March 16 – Ippolita Gonzaga, Italian nun (b. 1503)
 April 13 – Daniele Barbaro, Italian architect (b. 1514)
 July 3 – Aonio Paleario, Italian humanist and reformer (executed) (b. c. 1500)
 July 25 – Ivan Mikhailovich Viskovatyi, Russian diplomat
 August 4 – Marie Catherine Gondi, French court official (b. c. 1500)
 September 6 – Agostino Gallo, Italian agronomist (b. 1499)
 September 11 – Johannes Brenz, German theologian and Protestant Reformer (b. 1499)
 October 1 – Frans Floris, Flemish painter (b. 1520)
 October 18 – Manuel da Nóbrega, Portuguese Jesuit missionary in Brazil (b. 1517)
 October 20 
 João de Barros, Portuguese historian (b. 1496)
 Francesco Laparelli, Italian architect (b. 1521)
 November – Jacques Grévin, French dramatist (b. 1539)
 November 21 – Ruxandra Lăpușneanu, Moldavian regent (b. 1538)
 November 27 – Jacopo Sansovino, Italian sculptor and architect (b. 1486)
 December 15 – Frederick III of Legnica, Duke of Legnica (b. 1520)
 date unknown
 François Bonivard, Swiss patriot and historian (b. 1496)
 Francesco Primaticcio, Italian painter, architect, and sculptor (b. 1504)
 Tomás de Santa María, Spanish music theorist

References